The Lowry protein assay is a biochemical assay for determining the total level of protein in a solution. The total protein concentration is exhibited by a color change of the sample solution in proportion to protein concentration, which can then be measured using colorimetric techniques. It is named for the biochemist Oliver H. Lowry who developed the reagent in the 1940s. His 1951 paper describing the technique is the most-highly cited paper ever in the scientific literature, cited over 300,000 times.

Mechanism
The method combines the reactions of copper ions with the peptide bonds under alkaline conditions (the Biuret test) with the oxidation of aromatic protein residues. The Lowry method is based on the reaction of Cu+, produced by the oxidation of peptide bonds, with Folin–Ciocalteu reagent (a mixture of phosphotungstic acid and phosphomolybdic acid in the Folin–Ciocalteu reaction). The reaction mechanism is not well understood, but involves reduction of the Folin–Ciocalteu reagent and oxidation of aromatic residues (mainly tryptophan, also tyrosine). Experiments have shown that cysteine is also reactive to the reagent. Therefore, cysteine residues in protein probably also contribute to the absorbance seen in the Lowry assay. The result of this reaction is an intense blue molecule known as heteropolymolybdenum Blue. The concentration of the reduced Folin reagent (heteropolymolybdenum Blue) is measured by absorbance at 660 nm. As a result, the total concentration of protein in the sample can be deduced from the concentration of tryptophan and tyrosine residues that reduce the Folin–Ciocalteu reagent.

The method was first proposed by Lowry in 1951. The bicinchoninic acid assay and the Hartree–Lowry assay are subsequent modifications of the original Lowry procedure.

See also
 Biuret test
 Bradford protein assay

References

 Walker, J. M. (2002). The protein protocols handbook. Totowa, N.J: Humana Press.

External links
 A simplification of the protein assay method of Lowry et al. which is more generally applicable

Biochemistry detection reactions
Protein methods
Analytical chemistry
Reagents for biochemistry

 Protein Estimation using Lowry Method in Acube Lifesciences